The Mudrarakshasa (मुद्राराक्षस, IAST: Mudrārākṣasa) is a Sanskrit-language play by Vishakhadatta that narrates the ascent of the king Chandragupta Maurya (  BCE) to power in India. The play is an example of creative writing, but not entirely fictional. It is dated variously from the late 4th century to the 8th century CE.

Characters
Chandragupta Maurya, one of the protagonists
Chanakya, one of the protagonists 
Rakshasa, the main antagonist
Malayketu, the son of Parvataka and one of the henchmen
Parvatak, a greedy king who firstly supported Chandragupta but later changed his preference to Dhana Nanda
Vaidhorak
Durdhara, wife of Chandragupta Maurya
Bhadraketu
Chandandasa
Jeevsidhhi

Adaptations 
There is a Tamil version based on the Sanskrit play and Keshavlal Dhruv translated the original into Gujarati as Mel ni Mudrika (1889). There is a Kannada version of the play Mudramanjusha written by Kempunarayana.

The later episodes of the TV series Chanakya were based mostly on the Mudrarakshasa.

Feature film

A film in Sanskrit was made in 2006 by Dr Manish Mokshagundam, using the same plot as the play but in a modern setting.

Editions 

 
 . Second edition 1893, Fifth edition 1915. Sixth edition 1918, reprinted 1976 and by Motilal Banarsidass, 2000.
 
 
 
  
 . Reprint 2004,  First edition 1900
 
 
 
  Review
  (In Telugu script, with Telugu introduction and commentary) Another version
 . Originally published as part of Three Sanskrit plays (1981, Penguin Classics).

References

Citations

Sources
 

Sanskrit plays
Ancient Indian culture
Works about the Maurya Empire
Plays set in the 4th century BC
Plays set in India
Cultural depictions of kings
Cultural depictions of Indian men
Indian plays adapted into films
Buddhist plays
Ancient indian Dramas